Mohammed Yusuf Ansari (born 19 June 1970) is a former Indian professional footballer who played for India national football team as a goalkeeper.

Playing career
Yusuf Ansari started his professional football career with Air India F.C. in 1992 and was also a part of the Maharastra State Football Team. Later, he became part of India national football team which played 1992 Olympics Men's Asian qualifiers and 1993 World Cup qualifiers. His notable matches for the national team include two appearances in 1991 Olympics qualifiers against Syria national football team. He was also a part of 1993 Nehru Cup squad.

Coaching career

Air India
On 14 December 2010, Yusuf Ansari was appointed as the new head coach of Air India FC. The team finished 12th in the 2009–10 I-League. Following the season, he resigned from the head coach position and was later appointed as the goalkeeping coach under Santosh Kashyap. After spending two years there he left the team in 2013.

Maharashtra State Football team
In 2014, he joined Maharashtra Football team as their head coach. He coached the team in several tournaments including the Santosh Trophy.

Indian Arrows
Yusuf Ansari joined the I-league side Indian Arrows in 2017 as their goalkeeping coach for one season.

Kerala Blasters
In 2018, he joined the Indian Super League club Kerala Blasters as the goalkeeping coach for their reserves. After spending two years with the youth teams, he was promoted to the senior team of the Blasters  as their new goalkeeping coach in April 2020.

Personal life
Born in Mumbai, Maharastra, Yusuf Ansari  was appointed as the Assistant Manager in Air India. His Father was also a footballer who played for Indian Railways.

Statistics

Managerial statistics

Honours

India
SAFF Championship: 1993; runner-up: 1995

References

1970 births
Living people
Footballers from Mumbai
Indian footballers
India international footballers
Association football goalkeepers
I-League managers
Air India FC managers
Kerala Blasters FC non-playing staff